Toon In with Me is an American live-action/animated anthology television series created by Neal Sabin for MeTV and MeTV Plus. A special preview episode aired on January 1, 2021, with the main series officially debuting on January 4, 2021.

The show is hosted in live-action segments by Bill, MeTV's "cartoon curator", along with his puppet friend, Toony the Tuna. Each episode contains five animated shorts taken from classic series including Looney Tunes/Merrie Melodies, Tom and Jerry, Betty Boop, Popeye, The Pink Panther, The Inspector, Roland and Rattfink and many others.

Unlike previous anthology series or reruns of these classic cartoons, many of these airings are remastered from their original negatives. Many of these remastered shorts have not been released on home media or streaming, making these airings the first time some of the cartoons are seen remastered and restored in HD.

Premise and characters
Toon In with Me harkens back to locally produced children's programs that aired from the 1930s through the 1990s, with a live-action host, comedy and puppet segments in between classic cartoons.

The show is hosted from the MeTV studios by Bill the Cartoon Curator (played by Bill Leff).

His co-host is Toony (puppeteered by Kevin Fleming), a cartoon-loving tuna puppet, whom Bill has to take care of while Toony's owner, Goldie Fisher (Leila Gorstein) (Seasons 1-2), is away on a world tour. As they present all of the cartoons, Bill and Toony deal with various issues in the studio, video chat with Goldie and receive useful information from game show host Mr. Quizzer (also played by Fleming).  Fleming and Gorstein also play many other characters.

Each episode contains five or six classic animated shorts (except for "MeTV’s Cartoon Kick-Off Show", which contains ten), and most shows end with Bill and Toony showing off drawings and photos sent in by fans via the show's website.

On Friday, June 24, 2022, Leila Gorstein left the show in the episode "Farewell Goldie", and as Leila left the show, so did a number of her characters such as Boxcar, Lorna Green and others.

Episodes

</onlyinclude>

Spin-off

Sventoonie, a spin-off television series of Toon In with Me as well as the Me TV hosted horror movie series Svengoolie, premiered on Me TV on March 26, 2022. Sventoonie is also hosted by Toony (voiced and performed by Kevin Fleming). His co-hosts are Blob E. Blob, a puppet blob fish DJ who speaks in sound effects, and Trevor Ground, an undead video store clerk (performed by Steven Fleming) In the series, Sventoonie and his guests provide breakdowns and commentary of a condensed edit of a horror movie from the set of Svengoolie. 

On July 16th 2022, MeTV announced that Sventoonie would be renewed for a second season beginning in October 2022.

Series featured

Toon-In With Me showcases classic animated theatrical shorts from the Golden Age of American Animation. Most of the cartoons shown are from Warner Bros. or subsidiaries owned by Warner Bros. Discovery, such as Turner Entertainment. This includes the original Looney Tunes and Merrie Melodies cartoons made by Warner Bros. cartoons, cartoons originally made by the Metro-Goldwyn-Mayer cartoon studio (ie. Tom and Jerry, Droopy, Barney Bear, Screwy Squirrel, George and Junior, and Happy Harmonies) as well as the Popeye the Sailor and Superman shorts from Fleischer and Famous Studios originally released by Paramount Pictures (under licensed with King Features Entertainment for Popeye original comics and WB's subsidiary company, DC Comics for Superman characters).

Outside of Warner Bros, Toon in with Me also showcases cartoons owned by other studios such as Amazon's Metro-Goldwyn-Mayer (ie. DePatie-Freleng cartoons: The Pink Panther, The Inspector and Roland and Rattfink), Sony Pictures (Screen Gems' Color Rhapsodies), Paramount Global's Paramount Pictures (under Melange Pictures, LLC) (Max Fleischer's Betty Boop and Color Classics) and NBCUniversal / Comcast (Walter Lantz's Woody Woodpecker).

See also
 Saturday morning cartoon
 Golden Age of American animation

References

External links
 
 

2020s American animated television series
2020s American anthology television series
2020s American children's comedy television series
2020s American sketch comedy television series
2021 American television series debuts
American children's animated anthology television series
American children's animated comedy television series
American television series with live action and animation
American television shows featuring puppetry
Children's sketch comedy
Looney Tunes television series
Tom and Jerry television series
Tex Avery
Betty Boop
Popeye the Sailor television series
The Pink Panther (cartoons) television series
Animation fandom
English-language television shows
MeTV original programming
Television series about fish